Central Gwinnett High School is a public high school in Lawrenceville, Georgia, United States. The school is operated by Gwinnett County Public Schools. Jordan Middle School and Moore Middle School are its feeders.

Orchestra
The Central Gwinnett Orchestra has performed in Orlando, Fort Lauderdale, Washington, D.C., New Orleans, New York City, and on the morning show Good Day Atlanta. In 2007, the orchestra performed in Washington D.C. at the World War II Memorial.

Notable alumni
 EJay Day - singer-songwriter; top 10 finalist in the original season of American Idol
 Jonathan Massaquoi - football player
 Ted Roof - assistant football coach and former college football player
 Edmund Kugbila - football player

References

External links
 Central Gwinnett High School website
 Gwinnett County Public Schools website

Public high schools in Georgia (U.S. state)
Schools in Gwinnett County, Georgia
1957 establishments in Georgia (U.S. state)
Educational institutions established in 1957